Clorinda is a fictional character appearing in Torquato Tasso's poem Jerusalem Delivered, first published in 1581. She is a warrior woman of the Saracen army.

First introduced in the second canto of the poem, when she rescues from execution Sofronia and Olindo, two Christian lovers of Jerusalem, she is next discovered under the command of the King of Jerusalem, Aladine, aiding that city's defences, together with the bold knight Argantes. Tancred saw her on the field and fell in love with her, thus refusing to do battle with her. Because of this, a lesser champion was sent out from the Christian hosts, and Clorinda slew him. Erminia, her companion, being herself enamoured of Tancred, then escaped Jerusalem in the guise of Clorinda, purposing to enter the Christian camp, but being surprised by a party of knights without, she fled and was lost in the forests. 

Tancred falls in love with her in Canto 3. During a night battle in which she sets the Christian siege tower on fire, she is killed by Tancredi, who does not recognise her in her armour and the darkness.  She converts to Christianity before dying (Canto 12). 

The character of Clorinda is inspired in part by Virgil's Camilla and by Bradamante in Ariosto; the circumstances of her birth (a Caucasian girl born to African parents) are modeled on the lead character (Chariclea) from the ancient Greek novel by Heliodorus of Emesa.

In the arts
Il combattimento di Tancredi e Clorinda is an operatic scena for three voices by Claudio Monteverdi, dramatising the final fight, first performed in 1624, and popular since the revival of interest in early music in the mid-20th century.  Though the spate of 18th-century operas based on Tasso mostly covered different parts of the plot, especially the story of Armida, Clorinda was the first contralto role in French opera, in Tancrède, a tragédie en musique of 1702 by composer André Campra and librettist Antoine Danchet.

Clorinda's fight with Tancred and her conversion and death were especially popular subjects for artists. 

Torquato Tasso characters
Literary characters introduced in the 1580s
Fictional women soldiers and warriors